The Live United Texarkana Bowl is a college football bowl game played annually since 2013 in Texarkana, Arkansas between teams from NCAA Division II. Since 2020 the title sponsor has been Farmers Bank & Trust.

It is one of four NCAA Division II sanctioned bowl games, all played annually on the first Saturday in December. The others are the Mineral Water Bowl (currently on hiatus), the Heritage Bowl, and the America's Crossroads Bowl.

The game selection committee extends an invitation to the highest-standing team from the Great American Conference (GAC) which does not qualify for the NCAA Division II Football Championship playoffs. The opponent is an at-large team selected from either the Lone Star Conference (LSC) or the Mid-America Intercollegiate Athletics Association (MIAA). The MIAA and LSC were previously tied into the Kanza Bowl, which was played from 2009 to 2012. Teams from the GAC, LSC, and MIAA are also eligible for the Heritage Bowl.
 
Profits from the game are donated to the United Way of Greater Texarkana. The 2020 edition was not contested due to the Covid-19 pandemic.

Game results

Wins by conference

References

External links
 

American football in Arkansas
College football bowls
Texarkana, Arkansas
Bowl
Great American Conference